Maryana Volodymyrivna Bezuhla (born 17 May 1988), is a Ukrainian politician who is currently a People's Deputy Ukraine, representing Ukraine's 217th electoral district. She is also an employee the Minister of Defense.

Bezuhla is also the chairman of the Temporary Commission of Inquiry of the Verkhovna Rada to investigate possible illegal actions of government officials and others who could contribute to the violation of state sovereignty, territorial integrity and inviolability of Ukraine and pose a threat to national security of Ukraine, since 19 May 2021.

Biography
Maryana Bezuhla was born in Kyiv on 17 May 1988.

She graduated from the First Medical Faculty of the A. A. Bogomolets National Medical University with a degree in General Medicine and the Ukrainian Military Medical Academy in the direction of General Practice - Family Medicine.  She completed an internship at the US Department of State, where, following the course, she received a specialization in organization and management of healthcare.

She worked in a clinic, was at the front-line. She worked in the Project Office of Reforms of the Ministry of Defense, reformed the medical supply system of the Ukrainian Armed Forces, head of the program "Reform of the Armed Forces medical supply system" in the Ministry of Defense. As of 2019, she was a senior inspector for control over the orders execution of the Center for Performance Activities Support department of civilian experts in the Ukrainian Ministry of Defense and the Ukrainian Armed Forces General Staff.

Bezuhla was a candidate for People's Deputies from the Servant of the People party in the 2019 parliamentary elections (constituency No. 217, part of the Obolonskyi district of Kyiv). Bezuhla Chairman of the Subcommittee on the Implementation of NATO Values and Standards, International Military Cooperation and Peacekeeping. She is also a member of the Permanent Delegation to the NATO Parliamentary Assembly.

Bezuhla was elected a member in the majority constituency No. 217 (Obolonsky district, Kyiv). At the parliament, she became Deputy Chairman of the Committee on National Security, Defense and Intelligence.

According to media reports, on the eve of the election, agitators donated free T-shirts and caps in exchange for a subscription to the Facebook community Bezugla. At the time of the election: Senior Inspector for Monitoring the Implementation of the Assignments of the Department of Civilian Experts of the Service Support Center of the Ministry of Defense of Ukraine and the General Staff of the Armed Forces of Ukraine, as an independent.

On 10 November 2019, she joined the Servant of the People party.

On 12 December 2019, Bezugla became a member of the Humanitarian Country Inter-Factional Association, created at the initiative of UAnimals to promote humanistic values and protect animals from cruelty.

On 7 December 2020, she was included in the list of Ukrainian individuals against whom sanctions were imposed by the Russian government.

Bezuhla is since April 2022 in the Ukrainian-Russian war zone to "try to help, organize communication between the military and civilians."

On the 5th May 2022, Bezuhla submitted a draft law to the Verkhovna Rada which could allow commanders to kill military personnel in a combat situation if they refused to follow orders.  At the time of the submission, during martial law and in a combat situation, commanders had the right to use weapons against violators of the charter "without leading to the death of a serviceman".  This draft law would have removed this line.  The draft law proved highly controversial, and as such was withdrawn on the 24th May 2022.

References

1988 births
Politicians from Kyiv
Physicians from Kyiv
Living people
Servant of the People (political party) politicians
21st-century Ukrainian women politicians
21st-century Ukrainian politicians
Ninth convocation members of the Verkhovna Rada
People of the 2022 Russian invasion of Ukraine
Women members of the Verkhovna Rada